The 2002 FIS Ski Jumping Grand Prix was the 9th Summer Grand Prix season in ski jumping on plastic. Season began on 10 August 2002 in Hinterzarten, Germany and ended on 14 September 2002 in Innsbruck, Austria.

Calendar

Men

Standings

Overall

After 6 events.

Nations Cup

After 6 events.

See also
 2002–03 World Cup

References

Grand Prix
FIS Grand Prix Ski Jumping